Oh Dae-gyu (born May 13, 1967) is a South Korean actor. He appears in television dramas, notably First Wives' Club (2007), Three Brothers (2009), and War of the Roses (2011).

He has been called the "South Korean Mark Ruffalo".

Filmography

Television series

Film

Musical theatre

Awards and nominations

References

External links
 
 
 

1967 births
Living people
South Korean male television actors
South Korean male film actors
South Korean male musical theatre actors
Chung-Ang University alumni
Korea University alumni